Symbolistis is a genus of moth in the family Gelechiidae.

Species
 Symbolistis argyromitra Meyrick, 1904
 Symbolistis orophota Meyrick, 1904

References

Dichomeridinae